Mercury(I) sulfate, commonly called mercurous sulphate (UK) or mercurous sulfate (US) is the chemical compound Hg2SO4. Mercury(I) sulfate is a metallic compound that is a white, pale yellow or beige powder. It is a metallic salt of sulfuric acid formed by replacing both hydrogen atoms with mercury(I). It is highly toxic; it could be fatal if inhaled, ingested, or absorbed by skin.

Structure

In the crystal, mercurous sulfate is made up of Hg22+ center with an Hg-Hg distance of about 2.50 Å.   The SO42− anions form both long and short Hg-O bonds ranging from 2.23 to 2.93 Å.

Focusing on the shorter Hg-O bonds, the Hg – Hg – O bond angle is 165°±1°.

Preparation
One way to prepare mercury(I) sulfate is to mix the acidic solution of mercury(I) nitrate with 1 to 6 sulfuric acid solution:,

Hg2(NO3)2 + H2SO4 → Hg2SO4 + 2 HNO3

It can also be prepared by reacting an excess of mercury with concentrated sulfuric acid:

2 Hg + 2 H2SO4 → Hg2SO4 + 2 H2O + SO2

Use in electrochemical cells
Mercury(I) sulfate is often used in electrochemical cells. It was first introduced in electrochemical cells by Latimer Clark in 1872, It was then alternatively used in Weston cells made by George Augustus Hulett in 1911. It has been found to be a good electrode at high temperatures above 100 °C along with silver sulfate.

Mercury(I) sulfate has been found to decompose at high temperatures. The decomposition process is endothermic, and it occurs between 335 °C and 500 °C.

Mercury(I) sulfate has unique properties that make the standard cells possible. It has a rather low solubility (about one gram per liter); diffusion from the cathode system is not excessive; and it is sufficient to give a large potential at a mercury electrode.

References

Sulfates
Mercury(I) compounds